Narajole Raj College, also known as Narajole College, is an undergraduate & post graduate in Bengali & Sanskrit education,  coeducational college situated in Narajole, Paschim Medinipur, West Bengal. It was established in 1966. It is affiliated with Vidyasagar University.

Departments

Science
Chemistry
Physics
Mathematics
Botany
Zoology
Physiology

Arts
Bengali Hons`s & POST GRADUATE
English
Sanskrit Hons`s & POST GRADUATE
History
Geography
Political Science
Philosophy
Education
Physical Education

Accreditation
The college is recognized by the University Grants Commission (UGC).

See also

References

External links
 Narajole Raj College

Colleges affiliated to Vidyasagar University
Educational institutions established in 1966
Universities and colleges in Paschim Medinipur district
1966 establishments in West Bengal